This article lists major events that happened in 2017 in the Netherlands.

Incumbents
 Monarch: Willem-Alexander
 Prime Minister: Mark Rutte (VVD)
 Speaker of the House of Representatives: Khadija Arib (PvdA)
 President of the Senate: Ankie Broekers-Knol (VVD)

Events
 21 January: Women's March in Amsterdam and The Hague.
 26 January: Ard van der Steur (VVD) resigns as Minister of Security and Justice.
 1 March: Arno Brok (VVD) is appointed to be the King's Commissioner of Friesland.
 3 March: Prime Minister Mark Rutte refuses to allow Turkish authorities to organise a demonstration on Dutch territory as part of the campaign for the upcoming constitutional referendum; beginning of the 2017 Dutch–Turkish diplomatic incident.
 15 March: Dutch general election, 2017.
 17 March: Pauline Krikke (VVD) takes over as Mayor of The Hague.
 9 May: Dick Advocaat assumes for the third time the position of coach of the Netherlands national football team.
 14 May: Feyenoord wins the 2016–17 Eredivisie.
 27 May: at Eindhoven Airport, a parking building under construction collapses; no workers are hurt as it happens on a Saturday.
 July–August: 2017 fipronil eggs contamination.
 1 September: Ahmed Marcouch (PvdA) becomes the new Mayor of Arnhem.
 4 October: Jeanine Hennis-Plasschaert (VVD) and Tom Middendorp resign from the Ministry of Defence.
 5 October: death of the Mayor of Amsterdam, Eberhard van der Laan (PvdA), due to cancer.
 18–22 October: Amsterdam Dance Event, Dutch DJ Martin Garrix wins DJ Mag's Top 100 first place for the second time.
 26 October: installment of the Third Rutte cabinet.
 1 November: King Willem-Alexander inaugurates the Rijnstraat 8 building in The Hague, new seat of both the Ministry of Foreign Affairs and Ministry of Infrastructure, Public Works and Water Management.
 18 November: pro-Zwarte Piet locals occupy the A7 motorway near Dokkum, Friesland to block demonstrators from getting into town and disrupt the Sinterklaas festivities.
 29 November: Slobodan Praljak commits suicide in the courtroom of the International Criminal Tribunal for the former Yugoslavia, The Hague.
 1 December: Jetta Klijnsma (PvdA) is appointed to be the King's Commissioner of Drenthe.
 10 December: opening of Boskoop Snijdelwijk railway station.
 13 December: Lilian Marijnissen succeeds to Emile Roemer as Leader of the Socialist Party.

See also
 2016–17 Eredivisie
 List of Dutch Top 40 number-one singles of 2017
 Netherlands in the Eurovision Song Contest 2017
 Netherlands in the Junior Eurovision Song Contest 2017

References

 
Netherlands
Netherlands
2010s in the Netherlands
Years of the 21st century in the Netherlands